The Family of Mr Shalash (Egyptian Arabic: عائلة الأستاذ شلش, translit: A’elat El Ostath Shalash, aliases: Mr. Shalash’s Family, French: La famille Chalache) is a 1990 Egyptian comedy drama miniseries directed by Mohamed Nabih and starring Salah Zulfikar as Mr. Farouk Shalash. The series is based on a story written by Mohamed Nabih and Ahmed Awad. The series was aired during Ramadan on 27 March 1990 on Egyptian television.

Plot 
The events revolve around the daily life of Mr. Farouk Shalash (Salah Zulfikar), through a large number of comic situations and paradoxes that arise through his relationship with his wife and children, or his relationships with neighbors or with his co-workers showing social problems that face the community through the small family of Mr. Shalash.

Cast 

 Salah Zulfikar: Farouk Shalash
 Laila Taher: Nagia
 Mahmoud al-Gendy: Mahmoud
 Ahmed Salama: Hisham Shalash
 Nahed Gabr: The soapy strength of hearts
 Gamal Ismail: Usta Azqalani
 Salwa Othman: I wrote Habiba Nabil
 Zuzu Nabil: Fitna Hanim
 Eglal Zaki: Laila Shalash
 Tahiyyat Al-Ansari: Sahar Shalash
 Magda Zaki: Nadia Shalash
 Imad Rashad: Nabil Shalash
 Alaa Awad: Hani is a classmate of Sahar
 Nabil Noureddine Dr. Medhat
 Nashwa Mustafa: Enas, Hisham's colleague
 Ashraf Farouk
 Mahmoud Alwan
 Lashina Lashin
 Hani Kamal: Dr. Ahmed
 Sherif Idris: Ramy son of Nadia Shalash
 Adel Sharif: a child
 Iman Yousry: a child
 Muhammed Hussain: Child
 Reem: a child
 Nesma Hamed: a child
 Sherif Sabry: Alaa is Nadia's husband
 Nadia Ezzat: Shalash's neighbor, Sukkar
 Sahar Talaat
 Olfat Sokkar: Shalash's neighbor's, Dawlat
 Enayat Saleh: wife of Usta Fathi
 Nahir Amin: Hemmat is Shalash's neighbor
 Qassem Al-Dali: Osta Fathi
 Fifi Youssef: The mother of the strength of hearts
 Rania Fathallah
 Nawal Hashem: husband of Usta Azqalani
 Hussein Sherif: Helmy is a Shalash driver
 Saeed Obaid
 Farouk Ramadan
 Suleiman Hussein
 Moheb Kasser
 Tawfiq Al-Kurdi
 Tariq Mandour: Dr.  Ayman Othman
 Hassan Mustafa
 Salah Sadiq
 Sayed Abdel Fattah
 Musa Salem
 Mahmoud Gleefon
 Ezzat Badran
 Adel El-Shennawi
 Magdy Said: Nabil's colleague
 Sayed Mustafa
 Abdul Rahman Hamid
 Mr hussain
 Mohammed Jalal
 Fayza Abu Hatab
 Mahmoud El Hefnawy is Hisham's colleague at the college

See also
 Arab television drama
 List of Egyptian television series
 Salah Zulfikar filmography

References

External links 

 Mr. Shalash’s Family on elCinema
 

Arabic television series
Egyptian drama television series
Egyptian Radio and Television Union original programming